The 1860 United States presidential election in Texas was held on November 6, 1860. State voters chose four electors to represent the state in the Electoral College, which chose the president and vice president.

Texas voted for the Southern Democratic nominee John C. Breckinridge, who received over 75% of the vote. Texas was Breckinridge's strongest state.

Republican Party candidate Abraham Lincoln was not on the ballot in Texas; neither was "Northern Democrat" Stephen A. Douglas, although Douglas did gain 18 votes as a write-in candidate. Douglas supporters had agreed to transfer their allegiance to Constitutional Union candidate John Bell, but Bell carried only three counties in the state and it is sometimes thought that the German-American abolitionists in such counties as Gillespie refrained from visiting the polls.

Soon after this election, Texas seceded from the United States in March 1861 and joined the Confederate States of America. It would not participate in the following elections in 1864 and 1868. The state would not be readmitted into the Union until 1870 and would not participate in another presidential election until 1872.

Results

See also
 United States presidential elections in Texas

References

1860
Texas
1860 Texas elections